Christmas is an extended play (EP) by English synth-pop duo Pet Shop Boys. It was released on 14 December 2009 by Parlophone.

The EP contains a new version of their exclusive 1997 fan club single "It Doesn't Often Snow at Christmas" and a new version of the track "All Over the World" from their tenth studio album Yes, both of which featured additional production by Marius de Vries. The EP also includes a cover of Madness' song "My Girl", along with a remix of it, as well as a medley of Pet Shop Boys' 1988 song "Domino Dancing" with Coldplay's 2008 song "Viva la Vida".

"All Over the World" was released to radio stations as a promotional recording and was given its first airing on Chris Evans's BBC Radio 2 show on 9 November 2009. "It Doesn't Often Snow at Christmas" followed three weeks later in the first week of December. 

Following the release of the EP, "It Doesn't Often Snow at Christmas" entered the UK Singles Chart on 26 December 2009 at number 40, and is to date the last Pet Shop Boys single to have entered the UK top 40.

The video for "All Over the World" was directed by Blue Leach and features live highlights from the Pandemonium tour. It was posted online a few days prior to the EP's release.

The cover artwork continues the balloon motif from the Brazilian compilation Party.

Track listing

Notes
  signifies an assistant producer

Personnel
Credits adapted from the liner notes of Christmas.

Musicians

 Matt Robertson – new programming, orchestral arrangements 
 Jason Boshoff – new programming 
 Chris Storr – trumpet solo 
 Pete Gleadall – original programming ; programming 
 Stuart Price – arrangements 
 Pet Shop Boys – arrangements 
 Marius de Vries – orchestral arrangements 
 Perry Montague-Mason – leader of the orchestra 
 Jenny O'Grady – choirmaster

Technical

 Pet Shop Boys – original track production ; new production ; production ; remix 
 Marius de Vries – new production 
 Tim Weidner – mixing 
 Brian Higgins – original track production 
 Xenomania – original track production 
 Stuart Price – production, mixing 
 Dave Emery – production assistance 
 Gary Thomas – orchestra and choir recording 
 Mat Bartram – orchestra and choir recording assistance 
 Andy Bradfield – orchestra and choir mixing 
 Mo Hausler – orchestra and choir mixing assistance 
 Izzy Morley – orchestra and choir mixing assistance 
 Tim Young – mastering

Artwork
 Farrow – design, art direction
 PSB – design, art direction
 John Ross – photography

Charts

References

2009 EPs
Albums produced by Marius de Vries
Albums produced by Stuart Price
Christmas EPs
Parlophone EPs
Pet Shop Boys albums